“Come Back to Me” is the fifth single by Arjen Anthony Lucassen's progressive rock/metal opera Ayreon, released on 2005 from its sixth album, The Human Equation, in which the song was called “Day Seven: Hope”.

The song is written, composed, produced and mixed by Lucassen, who is also performing lead vocals, guitar, bass and keyboards on it. Lucassen is portraying a character called Best Friend, while James LaBrie from Dream Theater also sing as the album's main character, Me.

"Come Back to Me" is the only single ever released by Lucassen in which he provides lead vocals. In the single version, Joost van den Broek from After Forever and Cleem Determeijer are playing keyboards, while Peter Vink is playing bass. A video clip was also released.

Music
The song follows the plot of the main story of the album. For more information of it, see the plot at the article of the album.
It is the seventh day, and Best Friend decides to make an attempt to reach Me through his position, and decides to take Me back to the days when they were young, when they didn't have a worry in the world. Best Friend calls to Me, telling him to come back to the real world, in pain. Me feels as if he is trapped, and tries to shout, but something holds him back; as if his quest was not yet complete. Though in this version there's an extended bridge before a different tone of the ending; whereas in the album version Me's screams end the song to dark powerchords to represent his plight, the ending of Come back to Me is more upbeat, the “happy” arpeggios keep playing, Arjen keeps singing the chorus with Me's screams repeated.

Music video
A music video was shot for the song. It shows Best Friend (Arjen) visiting Me (who is not performed by James LaBrie) at the hospital. Sitting next to the bed, Best Friend looks at a photo album that he is holding. Through the photos of him and Me, Best Friend remembers the good times he had with Me, like camping, chasing girls, stealing fruit, etc. Meanwhile, the band is shown performing next to a swimming pool. Arjen and Ed are seen playing the acoustic guitar and the drums, respectively, while Peter Vink and Joost Van den Broek are playing the bass guitar and the keyboard, respectively. In the end, all the musicians are seen performing in the pool, while swimming, or just diving at the pool, along with a young Best Friend and Me.

Track listing
Come Back to Me - 3:00
August Fire - 2:42
When I'm Sixty-Four (The Beatles cover) - 2:52
Back 2 Me [Dance Mix by Two Maniacs] - 3:20
Come Back to Me (video clip)
Making of (video)

Personnel
Arjen Lucassen - vocals, electric guitar, bass guitar, electronic keyboard, synthesizer
James LaBrie (Dream Theater) - vocals
Cleem Determeijer - keyboards
Joost van den Broek (After Forever) - keyboards
Peter Vink - bass guitar
Ed Warby (Gorefest) - drum kit

References
Come Back to Me page at Ayreon's official website

External links
Ayreon official website

2005 singles
Ayreon songs
2004 songs